Varkos is a village of the Elassona municipality. Before the 2011 local government reform it was a part of the municipality of Verdikousa. The 2011 census recorded 47 inhabitants in the village. Varkos is a part of the community of Verdikousa.

Population
According to the 2011 census, the population of the settlement of Varkos was 47 people, a decrease of almost 45% compared with the population of the previous census of 2001.

See also
 List of settlements in the Larissa regional unit

References

Populated places in Larissa (regional unit)